Avatar Tor.Morsri (born September 27, 1993), is a Thai Muay Thai fighter.

Titles and accomplishments
Topking World Series
 2018 Topking Thailand Series -70 kg Champion
World Professional Muaythai Federation
 2017 WPMF World Middleweight -160 lbs Champion
 2017 WPMF World Super Middleweight -168 lbs Champion

Muay Thai record

|-  style="background:#fbb;"
| 2023-01-27|| Loss ||align=left| Mohammed Siasarani ||  ONE Friday Fights 2, Lumpinee Stadium || Bangkok, Thailand || Decision (majority) || 3 || 3:00
|- style="background:#cfc"
| 2022-09-17 || Win||align=left| Kaennorasingh D.N.A. Thailand || Road to ONE: Thailand 3, Lumpinee Stadium|| Bangkok, Thailand || KO (Punches) || 2 ||1:21
|-
! style=background:white colspan=9 |
|- style="background:#cfc"
| 2022-08-13 || Win||align=left| Wanchalerm Pakyok P.K. || Road to ONE: Thailand 2, Lumpinee Stadium|| Bangkok, Thailand || Decision (Unanimous) || 3 ||3:00
|-
! style=background:white colspan=9 |
|- style="background:#fbb"
| 2022-05-28 || Loss||align=left| Youssef Boughanem || Fairtex Fight, Lumpinee Stadium|| Bangkok, Thailand || Decision || 3 ||3:00
|-  style="background:#cfc;"
| 2022-04-16 || Win ||align=left| Reza Ahmadnezad || Fighter X || Hua Hin, Thailand || Decision || 5 || 3:00
|-  style="background:#cfc;"
| 2020-11-08 || Win ||align=left| Victor Almeida || Muay Thai Super Champ || Bangkok, Thailand || Decision || 3 || 3:00
|-  style="background:#cfc;"
| 2020-10-04 || Win ||align=left| Gligor Stojanov|| Muay Thai Super Champ || Bangkok, Thailand || TKO (Uppercuts)|| 3 ||
|-  style="background:#cfc;"
| 2020-09-06 || Win ||align=left| Attin Gaur || Muay Thai Super Champ || Bangkok, Thailand || Decision || 3 || 3:00
|-  style="background:#fbb;"
| 2020-03-22|| Loss ||align=left| Hiromi Wajima || K-1: K'Festa 3, -70 kg Championship Tournament Quarter Finals || Saitama, Japan || KO (Low Kick) ||3 || 0:40
|-  style="background:#fbb;"
| 2020-03-14 || Loss||align=left| Vong Vichhai || Sea TV Kun Khmer || Cambodia || Decision || 5 || 3:00
|-  style="background:#cfc;"
| 2020-02-16 || Win ||align=left| Roeung Sophorn || Kun Khmer || Cambodia || Decision || 5 || 3:00
|-  style="background:#fbb;"
| 2020-02-01 || Loss||align=left| Lao Chetra || CNC Kun Khmer || Cambodia || Decision || 5 || 3:00
|-  style="background:#fbb;"
| 2019-10-27|| Loss||align=left| Chadd Collins || MX MUAY XTREME || Bangkok, Thailand || Decision || 3 || 3:00
|-  style="background:#cfc;"
| 2018-09-22 || Win ||align=left| Reza Armadnezad || MX Muay Xtreme || Bangkok, Thailand || Decision || 3 || 3:00
|-  style="background:#cfc;"
| 2019-09-01 || Win||align=left| Thoeun Theara || Bayon TV || Cambodia || Decision || 5 || 3:00
|-  style="background:#cfc;"
| 2019-08-04 || Win ||align=left| Lorenzo || MX Muay Xtreme|| Bangkok, Thailand || TKO (Elbow)|| 1 ||
|-  style="background:#cfc;"
| 2019-07-27 || Win ||align=left| Thoeun Theara || TV5 Kun Khmer || Cambodia || Decision || 5 || 3:00
|-  style="background:#cfc;"
| 2019-06-23 || Win ||align=left| Piotr Lagozki || MX Muay Xtreme|| Bangkok, Thailand || TKO (Middle kicks)|| 2 ||
|-  style="background:#cfc;"
| 2019-06-09 || Win ||align=left| Roeung Sophorn || SeaTV || Cambodia || Decision || 5 || 3:00
|-  style="background:#fbb;"
| 2019-03-30 || Loss ||align=left| Rafi Bohic || Muaythai Singpatong || Phuket, Thailand || Decision || 5 || 3:00
|-  bgcolor="#fbb"
| 2019-03-17 || Loss || align=left| Pongsiri P.K.Saenchaimuaythaigym || Chang MuayThai Kiatpetch, OrTorGor.3 Stadium || Nonthaburi Province, Thailand || Decision || 5 || 3:00
|-  style="background:#cfc;"
| 2019-02-23 || Win ||align=left| Diego Beneduzzi || Top King World Series 28|| Surat Thani, Thailand || Decision || 3 || 3:00
|-  style="background:#cfc;"
| 2018-12-31 || Win ||align=left| Simanut Sor.Sarinya || Top King World Series 27, Final|| Pattaya, Thailand || TKO (Left Elbow)|| 2 || 
|-
! style=background:white colspan=9 |
|-  style="background:#cfc;"
| 2018-12-31 || Win ||align=left| Saifahlab Sitkruthai  || Top King World Series 27, Semi Final|| Pattaya, Thailand || KO (Left Elbow)|| 2 ||
|-  style="background:#cfc;"
| 2018-11-25 || Win ||align=left| Brahim Machkour || Top King World Series 25 || Thailand || KO (Knee to the body)|| 2 ||
|-  style="background:#cfc;"
| 2018-10-28 || Win ||align=left| Curtis Allen || Top King World Series 24 || Thailand || TKO|| 2 ||
|-  style="background:#cfc;"
| 2018-09-30 || Win ||align=left| Fabio Ferrari || Top King World Series 22 || Samui, Thailand || Decision || 3 || 3:00
|-  style="background:#cfc;"
| 2018-09-07 || Win ||align=left| Reza Ahmadnezhad || MX Muay Xtreme || Bangkok, Thailand || Decision || 3 || 3:00
|-  style="background:#fbb;"
| 2018-08-08 || Loss||align=left| Talaytong Sor.Thanaphet || || Thailand || Decision || 5 || 3:00
|-
! style=background:white colspan=9 |
|-  bgcolor="#fbb"
| 2018-07-15 || Loss || align=left| Pongsiri P.K.Saenchaimuaythaigym || MuayThaiJedsee, Channel 7 Stadium || Bangkok, Thailand || Decision || 5 || 3:00
|-  style="background:#cfc;"
| 2018-06-16 || Win ||align=left| Petchsanguan Sor.Chanasit || Top King World Series 21, Final || Surat Thani, Thailand || KO (Punches)|| 2 ||  
|-
! style=background:white colspan=9 |
|-  style="background:#cfc;"
| 2018-06-16 || Win ||align=left| Aroondej Phran26 || Top King World Series 21, Semi Final || Surat Thani, Thailand || Decision || 3 || 3:00
|-  style="background:#cfc;"
| 2018-05-18 || Win ||align=left| Magnus Andersson || MX Muay Xtreme || Bangkok, Thailand || Decision || 3 || 3:00
|-  bgcolor="#fbb"
| 2018-05-03 || Loss ||align=left| Yohan Lidon ||MFC 7  || France || KO (Right High Kick) || 3 ||
|-
! style=background:white colspan=9 |
|-  style="background:#cfc;"
| 2018-02-16 || Win ||align=left| Bruno Miranda || MX Muay Xtreme || Bangkok, Thailand || Decision || 3 || 3:00
|-  style="background:#cfc;"
| 2018-01-01 || Win ||align=left| Fahsura Wor.Phetpool ||  || Thailand || KO || 4 ||
|-  style="background:#fbb;"
| 2017-12-10 || Loss||align=left| Suayngam Pumpanmuang ||  || Thailand || Decision || 5 || 3:00
|-  style="background:#cfc;"
| 2017-11-17 || Win ||align=left| Mansurbek Toribov|| MX Muay Xtreme || Bangkok, Thailand || Decision || 3 || 3:00
|-  style="background:#cfc;"
| 2017-09-01 || Win ||align=left| Jenson Constantine || MX Muay Xtreme || Bangkok, Thailand || TKO || 2 ||
|-  style="background:#cfc;"
| 2017-07-28 || Win ||align=left| Ruslan Ataev || WPMF at Nang Loeng Horse Stadium || Bangkok, Thailand || Decision || 5 || 3:00 
|-
! style=background:white colspan=9 |
|-  style="background:#cfc;"
| 2017-06-09 || Win ||align=left| Vanderlei Santos || MX Muay Xtreme || Bangkok, Thailand || Decision || 3 || 3:00
|-  style="background:#cfc;"
| 2017-05-12 || Win ||align=left| Gregory Sanzo || MX Muay Xtreme || Bangkok, Thailand || KO (Elbows)|| 2 ||
|-  style="background:#cfc;"
| 2017-04-07 || Win ||align=left| Kadir Tastan|| MX Muay Xtreme || Bangkok, Thailand || Decision || 5 || 3:00
|-  style="background:#cfc;"
| 2017-03-16 || Win ||align=left| Tobias Alexandersson || Nai Khanom Tom|| Ayuthaya, Thailand || Decision || 5 || 3:00  
|-
! style=background:white colspan=9 |
|-  style="background:#cfc;"
| 2016- || Win||align=left| || MAX Muay Thai || Pattaya, Thailand || Decision || 3 || 3:00
|-  style="background:#cfc;"
| 2016-10-07 || Win||align=left| Wanchalerm Thanasuranakorn || MAX Muay Thai || Pattaya, Thailand || Decision || 3 || 3:00
|-  style="background:#fbb;"
| 2015-10-26 || Loss||align=left| Talaytong Sor.Thanaphet || || Chiang Mai, Thailand || Decision || 5 || 3:00
|-  style="background:#fbb;"
| 2015- || Loss||align=left| Suayngam Pumpanmuang ||  || Mahasarakham, Thailand || Decision || 5 || 3:00
|-  style="background:#fbb;"
| 2015-|| Loss ||align=left| Nuttadaj Phran26 ||  || Thailand || Decision|| 5 || 3:00
|-  style="background:#cfc;"
| 2015-|| Win||align=left| Yassine Boughanem ||  || Thailand || Decision|| 5 || 3:00
|-  style="background:#c5d2ea;"
| 2014-11-01 || No Contest||align=left| Teedet Sitjakun|| Omnoi Stadium - Isuzu Cup|| Samut Sakhon, Thailand || Referee stoppage || 4 || 
|-
! style=background:white colspan=9 |
|-  style="background:#fbb;"
| 2014-09-13|| Loss ||align=left| Armin Pumpanmuang || Omnoi Stadium  || Samut Sakhon, Thailand || Decision|| 5 || 3:00  
|-
| colspan=9 | Legend:

Lethwei record

|- style="background:#c5d2ea;"
| 2019-12-13 || Draw || align="left" | Thway Thit Win Hlaing || Lethwei Challenge Fight Mandalay ||  Mandalay, Myanmar || Draw || 5 || 3:00
|- style="background:#c5d2ea;"
| 2019-01-31 || Draw || align="left" | Soe Lin Oo || Win Sein Taw Ya 2019 || Mudon Township, Myanmar || Draw || 5 || 3:00
|-
| colspan=9 | Legend:

References

Avatar Tor.Morsri
Avatar Tor.Morsri
Middleweight kickboxers
Welterweight kickboxers
ONE Championship kickboxers 
Living people
1993 births
Avatar Tor.Morsri